Ulrich Viefers (born 26 May 1972, in Oberhausen) is a German rower.

Ulrich Viefer is 194 cm tall and weighs 93 kg. Viefer's place of residence is in Essen, Germany. He ranked 6th when he rowed for Germany in the 1999 World Rowing Championship that took place in St. Catharines, Canada. He also rowed in 1999 World Rowing Cup III in Lucerne, SUI where he ranked 1st representing Germany. He has competed in 14 competitions from 1990–1999. He achieved first place four times in those fourteen competitions.

References 

 
 

1972 births
Living people
Sportspeople from Oberhausen
Olympic rowers of Germany
Rowers at the 1996 Summer Olympics
Olympic silver medalists for Germany
Olympic medalists in rowing
German male rowers
World Rowing Championships medalists for Germany
Medalists at the 1996 Summer Olympics